Naze is a town in southeastern Nigeria, 408 km south of Abuja, the country's capital. It is located in the Owerri North local government area of Imo State. 

Alaenyi comprises five towns: Ihitte-Ogada, Awaka, Egbu, Naze and Owerri-Nchi-Ise. Naze is made up of six villages: Umuorie, Ezeakiri, Umuosu, Umuezuo, Okpuala, and Umuakali. The market is Nkwo Naze, hitherto known as Amara – Isu where traders from hinterlands (Isomas) came to see civil society. Today Naze is regarded for its farmers markets, vegetable stands, and large churches.

The people of Naze embraced Western education early on, and two mission schools, St Jude's Catholic School and St John's Anglican School, were established in the 19th and early 20th century. Because of this, many Nigerian statesmen have come from Naze, including Pa J.K. Nzerem, Pa Udo Ahana, Pa James Udeh, Pa Ihebuzor, Pa Oleru, Pa Emmanuel Onyiriuka, Pa Emeana, Pa Vincent Onyewuotu, Pa Daniel Onyewuotu, Pa Julius Amadi, Pa Theophilus Ihenacho, Pa Stephen Merenini, Pa Ngoka, Pa Benny Nzeh, Engr. Amadi Amechi, and Pa Cyril Udeh.  

Ancient History

Naze originally has 8 villages namely Umuorie, Ezeakiri, Umuosu, Umuezuo, Umuakai, Okpala, Nneagu, Nwarioke

The last two Nneagu and Nwarioke has been swallow up in the remaining six villages. Nwarioke is the present day Maduakola's compound in Umuosu Naze. Remnants of Nneagu can be found in Umuakali. 

Umuosu Naze 

Umuosu is a village in Naze community with 6 kindred namely Umuariabuo, Umuorieleke, Umumbirihe, Umulumohiri, Umuarioke, Umuibo namba 

Umuariabuo Kindred 

Umuariabuo is a kindred in Umuosu village Naze community. It shares a boundary with Egbu community, Umuakali Village, Umuorie village and Umuezuo Village.

Umuariabuo History: Ariabuo the founder of Umuariabuo Kindred gave birth to 5 children namely Odu, Egbudike, Okaroafor, Chukwukere and Nwaogu. Okoroafor gave birth to Agunwa, Ejelonu Onyeagoro, Onyemechara, Oguike and Anyanwu . Whereas Oguike and Anyanwu did not give birth to male children same with Odu, Egbudike, Chukwukere and Nwogu.  Agunwa gave birth to Daniel. Ejelonu  who married two wives gave birth to Onyewuotu and Merenini from one wife; Naze and Ekezie from the second wife. Onyeagoro gave birth to Nkwaze, Onyemechara gave birth to Joseph.

References 

Towns in Imo State